Chadchan is a taluq in the southern state of Karnataka, India. It is located in Vijayapura district in northern part of Karnataka.

Chadchan is a medium-sized town, mostly popular in northern Karnataka and southern Maharashtra for its wholesale clothing market. This town lies very close (just  from the border) to the Karnataka – Maharashtra border and hence is easily accessible to people from both the states.

Also, its neighbouring village Zalaki possess good connectivity to both Solapur and Vijayapura because of the national highway.

Demographics
According to 2011 India census, Chadchan had a population of 15,542, with 7923 males and 7619 females. The total number of children in the age group 0-6 is 2179.
The literacy rate for the town is 66.94%. In Chadchan male literacy stands at 73.79% while female literacy was 59.82%

Languages
Kannada is the official and most widely spoken language in the town. Majority of the population has Kannada as their first language while Urdu, Marathi are the other major minority languages spoken. The culture of Chadchan is also influenced by neighboring state of Maharashtra. While Kannada is the official and most widely spoken language in the town, Marathi is understood and spoken widely because of the considerable number of Marathi population and the town's affinity with the state border.

Religion
Hinduism is the most popular and the majority religion followed in the town. As in rest of the Bijapur District, Lingayatism is widely practiced and Lingayats form the biggest community within Hindus. The  village deity is Sri Sangameshwara and every year festival is celebrated to honor village deity. Islam is second most professed faith in the town.

Economy
Chadchan is a commercial center for nearby villages. Economy of the town is mostly service and agriculture based. Chadchan has been a major trading center for most of the villagers around the town. A large number of people work in unorganized sector as daily wage earners.

Transport

Road
The mode of transport is state-run buses running between cities. Chadchan has a bus station connecting it to major cities in North Karnataka and Maharashtra. Solapur is a major city that has connectivity to most cities in India.

Rail
It connects to both  Solapur railway station in Solapur and  Vijayapura railway station in Vijayapura. Regular trains are available from Solapur and Vijayapura to other parts of the country.

See also
 Bijapur
 Districts of Karnataka

References

External links
 http://vijayapura.nic.in/

Cities and towns in Bijapur district, Karnataka